2016 Shenzhen Open – Singles may refer to:

2016 ATP Shenzhen Open – Singles
2016 WTA Shenzhen Open – Singles

See also 

2016 Shenzhen Open (disambiguation)